The Indonesian Army and Marine Corps have several infantry brigades (shortened as Brigif). These brigades normally head about three infantry battalions. Currently the Army has 22 brigades and the Marine Corps has 4.

Infantry Brigades in Indonesia 
There are two types of infantry brigades in Indonesia: ordinary brigades and "Raider"-qualified brigades. Raider-qualified brigades head Raider Battalions which are under the management of the Kodams and Kostrad.

Infantry Brigades

Raider Infantry Brigades 
Raider infantry brigades head Raider Battalions.

Para Raider Infantry Brigades 
Para Raider infantry brigades head Para Raider Battalions. These were formerly Lintas Udara (Linud) / Airborne brigades.

Raider Mechanized Infantry Brigade 
Raider Mechanized brigades are under the command of Kostrad.

Mechanized Infantry Brigade 
These brigades are under the command of Kodam.

Marine Infantry Brigade 
While not part of the Army, the Indonesian Navy's Korps Marinir also have Brigade sized units.

Training Regiment of the Infantry Forces Center (Resimen Pusat Kesenjataan Infanteri) 
In addition to the brigades, there is also another regiment stationed at the Infantry Branch Center in the city of Bandung, West Java. The training regiment trains all officers, warrant officers, NCOs and enlisted personnel for basic skills intended for service in this branch. The Training Regiment falls under the responsibility of Commanding General Infantry (Komandan Pussenif), a general officer of lieutenant general rank, actual command of the regiment falls under the Director for Weapon Systems (Direktur Kesenjataan). The Infantry Branch Center was created on 9 May 1950 on the basis of both Republican infantry brigade depots and the educational institutions of the Royal Netherlands East Indies Army under the Indonesian Army Doctrine, Education and Training Development Command.

References 

Army units and formations of Indonesia